WHPM-LD (channel 23) is a low-power television station in Hattiesburg, Mississippi, United States, affiliated with the Fox network and owned by Waypoint Media. The station's studios are located on Mayfair Road in Hattiesburg, and its transmitter is located on Old Highway 11/Norton Road in unincorporated Lamar County south of US 98.

History

The station signed on June 15, 2005, as WHPM-LP carrying religious programming on analog UHF channel 30. It shut-down that signal and switched to digital channel 23 in 2009. However, the station would not switch its call sign to reflect the change until October 7, 2011, when it adopted WHPM-LD. It became the market's first locally based Fox affiliate on October 13, 2011. Until this point, the network was available off-air and on cable through WXXV-TV in Gulfport. That outlet strategically located its broadcast tower and designed a directional antenna pattern to enable the station to cover the Gulf Coast and Pine Belt regions of the state.

On September 10, 2012, WHPM took over promotional and advertising responsibilities of the area's cable-only CW affiliate "WBH". As a result, the service was added to a new second digital subchannel of WHPM in order to offer over-the-air viewers access to The CW. Except for local commercials, all programming is provided through the national CW Plus service. Initially, the station (now using the WHPM-LD2 call sign) remained on Comcast channel 59. Eventually, it began airing in 720p high definition over-the-air and on Comcast digital channel 438. It is no longer offered on the system's basic tier. As part of a long-term affiliation renewal with Media General, The CW moved to WHLT's digital subchannel on December 23, 2014. As of July 2015, MeTV and MyNetworkTV were added to a third subchannel. This TV was added to the second subchannel in September, returning the network to the market after WDAM-DT2 switched to ABC three years prior. WHPM-LD2 later switched to Antenna TV as of 2021.

Subchannels
The station's digital signal is multiplexed:

Programming
Syndicated programming featured on the station includes Family Guy, The Ellen DeGeneres Show, The Big Bang Theory and Two and a Half Men among others.

In addition to Fox programming, WHPM-LD operates the Hattiesburg–Laurel market's MyNetworkTV/MeTV affiliate on its LD3 subchannel, filling in programming for all time slots outside of the MyNetworkTV programming schedule with the MeTV schedule.

Newscasts
On September 25, 2015, Waypoint Media announced that it would launch a half-hour prime time newscast at 9:00 p.m. for WHPM-LD – the first such program in the Meridian market – on October 5. Although WHPM's operations are largely based out of the studios of sister stations WMDN and WGBC in Meridian (the latter of which will debut a prime time newscast on that same date), it is not clear if the program will be produced out of Hattiesburg or through WGBC/WMDN's Meridian facilities.

In October 2016, WHPM announced on their Facebook page that veteran broadcaster Randy Swan (formerly of nearby WDAM-TV) will join Waypoint Media as regional news director.

References

External links

Television channels and stations established in 2005
HPM-LD
Fox network affiliates
Low-power television stations in the United States
Waypoint Media
2005 establishments in Mississippi